Mark Grenville (born 30 April 1963) is a Guyanese cricketer. He played in four first-class matches for Guyana from 1984 to 1987.

See also
 List of Guyanese representative cricketers

References

External links
 

1963 births
Living people
Guyanese cricketers
Guyana cricketers
Sportspeople from Georgetown, Guyana